Le Mesnil-Angot is a former commune in the Manche department of the Normandy region of Northern France. On 28 February 2007, it was merged with the commune of Graignes to form Graignes-Mesnil-Angot.

References

Former communes of Manche